The 2002 Porto Open was a women's tennis tournament played on outdoor clay courts in Porto, Portugal and was part of Tier IV of the 2002 WTA Tour. It was the second and last edition of the tournament and was held from 1 April until 7 April 2002. First-seeded Ángeles Montolio won the singles title and earned $22,000 first-prize money.

Finals

Singles
 Ángeles Montolio defeated  Magüi Serna 6–1, 2–6, 7–5
 It was Montolio's 1st singles title of the year and the 3rd and last of her career.

Doubles
 Cara Black /  Irina Selyutina defeated  Kristie Boogert /  Magüi Serna 7–6(8–6), 6–4
 It was Black's 1st doubles title of the year and the 9th of her career. It was Selyutina's 2nd doubles title of the year and the 3rd and last of her career.

External links
 ITF tournament edition details
 Tournament draws

Porto Open
Porto Open
2002 in Portuguese tennis